Nikita Vavilin (born 13 May 1994) is a Russian rugby union player who generally plays as a flanker represents Russia internationally.

He was included in the Russian squad for the 2019 Rugby World Cup which is scheduled to be held in Japan for the first time and also marks his first World Cup appearance.

Career 
He made his international debut for Russia against Germany on 18 March 2018.

References 

Russian rugby union players
Russia international rugby union players
Living people
1994 births
Sportspeople from Moscow
Rugby union flankers